Krishnan Ajayan Nair (born 30 May 1979) is an Indian football player. He last played for Chirag United Club Kerala in the I-League, as a midfielder.

Career
Young Ajayan would play for S.V.H. School in his hometown where he won several trophies.

At the age of 11, Ajayan represented Mahatma Club in the popular Seven's tournament. He played for N.S.S. College and even the famous Mahatma Gandhi College, Trivandrum.

Ajayan was part of the Kerala University team where thrice they were state winners and twice winners of the South Zone.

Ajayan successfully completed his graduation and was awarded the Bachelor of Arts (Economics) degree with a first class.

Ajayan then joined SBT in 2000 where he played for the 4 years. Then in 2004–05 he played for Vasco S.C. In 2005, he signed for Mahindra United and was the captain of the Mahindra United football team until the club was closed down in 2010. Later, he transferred to Pune F.C. In 2011, he switched to Chirag United Club Kerala.

Statistics

International Goals

Honours

India
 AFC Challenge Cup: 2008
 SAFF Championship: 2005
 Nehru Cup: 2007

India U23
 LG Cup: 2002

References

External links
 
 

Indian footballers
1983 births
Living people
People from Kollam district
India international footballers
India youth international footballers
Malayali people
Footballers from Kerala
Mahindra United FC players
Pune FC players
I-League players
Vasco SC players
Chirag United Club Kerala players
Footballers at the 2002 Asian Games
Association football midfielders
Asian Games competitors for India